Lisnarick or Lisnarrick  is a small village in County Fermanagh, Northern Ireland, 4 km west of Irvinestown. It is situated in the civil parish of Derryvullan and historic barony of Lurg. The village was once known as Archdalestown after the nearby Castle Archdale. In the 2001 Census it had a population of about 250.

The village is mostly housing although there is one multi-purpose store, a restaurant, a filling station and a sub-post office. At the middle of the village is a green with horse chestnut trees and a play park. There is also a rath beside the bridge.

History
Rory Maguire was a leader of the Irish Rebellion of 1641 in Fermanagh, and the burning of Lisnarick on 23 October 1641 was the signal for the rebellion to start. Castle Archdale was also destroyed at the time.

Places of interest 
Castle Archdale Country Park is on the main Enniskillen to Kesh road (B82), 1 mile on the Enniskillen side of Lisnarick.

See also
List of villages in Northern Ireland
Lisnarick, County Antrim

References 

 NI Neighbourhood Information Service

Villages in County Fermanagh
Civil parish of Derryvullan